Joanna Marie Bérenger (born in 1989), also known as Joanna Bérenger is a Mauritian politician.

Early life and career
Joanna Bérenger is the daughter of Paul Bérenger and Arline Perrier. She has worked as a Project Manager of private enterprise Omnicane Limited, on the Mon-Trésor Smart City Project.

Political career
Joanna claims to have been involved in political activities in Vacoas since 2010. At the 07 November 2019 general elections she was elected to the National Assembly as a candidate of the MMM at Constituency No.16 Vacoas-Floréal. In October 2019 Joanna's father Paul Bérenger implored voters of Constituency No.16 to vote for his daughter, especially given that she was pregnant.

Controversies
During the campaign leading up to the 2019 General Elections, MMM candidate Joanna Bérenger was the subject of a news article titled Zak dans tante (literally meaning "Jackfruit in the basket" and casting doubt about the legitimacy of the unborn child), about her pregnancy and imminent entry into Parliament as a pregnant woman. Journalist Hansa Nancoo later clarified that she had not meant to hurt Joanna Bérenger, and that the title was only meant to act as "click-bait". Newspaper publisher L'Express later apologised.

References

1989 births
Living people
Members of the National Assembly (Mauritius)
Leaders of the Opposition (Mauritius)
People from Plaines Wilhems District
Mauritian people of French descent
Mauritian Militant Movement politicians